The Sacovăț is a left tributary of the river Bârlad in Romania. It discharges into the Bârlad near Todirești. The Tungujei Dam is located on the Sacovăț.

Tributaries

The following rivers are tributaries to the river Sacovăț:

Left: Pârâul Pietros, Frumușica, Răchitoasa (or Ricitna), Țibana
Right: Balta Neagră, Veja (or Corniș, or Hărmănaș), Gârla Arămii, Călina, Durăceasa, Zoi

References

Rivers of Romania
Rivers of Iași County
Rivers of Vaslui County